Ladell McLin is an American blues musician.

Life 
Ladell McLin is an American blues musician who was born on the Southside of Chicago, Illinois, to a family of musicians. His mother, singer Marsha McLin, and his father, musician Lamont Braswell, instilled music in Ladell's life from a young age. Braswell, coming from the doo-wop era, had roots with the South Side Chicago singer bands including with The Chi-Lites, of which his cousin, Marshall Thompson, was a founding member. In addition, Braswell worked as a music composer, as well as a jazz drummer, playing with Muddy Waters and Howlin' Wolf. McLin's grandfather was jazz trumpeter Woodrow Braswell who played for Billie Holiday.

Musical career 
Beginning around the age of 11, McLin would join his brother, drummer Andre Cotton, at musical shows at Teresa’s Lounge in Chicago and The Checkerboard Lounge. Cotton taught McLin how to play the drums. McLin himself began making music at the age of eleven. This is where McLin learned to play the blues from legends like Lefty Dizz, Junior Wells, Johny Dollar and Eddie Butler. He played his first concerts in Chicago with Cotton. At the age of 16, McLin began touring with Wilie Dixon, and played with Junior Wells, A.C. Reed, and many others. Appearances at the Chicago Blues Festival and the Checkerboard Lounge followed. The guitar became McLin's instrument of choice, and by age 19 he was hired to play with Eddie Burks. McLin subsequently performed in blues venues throughout the Midwest, and continued to learn onstage from the best in the business: Koko Taylor, John Primer, and Buddy Guy. He began playing with Buddy Guy's Legends (1997-1999), Buddy Miles, Vernon Reid, Paul Schafer, John Primer, Johnny Guitar Watson, and for Darryl McDaniels aka "DMC" ( Run-DMC ) and others. He appeared at New York's Apollo Theater, at the Montreux Jazz Festival with Carlos Santana, BB King, and Robert Randolph, and at the Paris Sons d'hiver jazz festival.

Discography 
Albums:
 2003: Ladell Mclin & the Lazy Americans – Live at the Bamboo Room (Download-Album)
 2004: Stand Out (Gigantic Music)
 2014: I am King (Aztec music)
Compilation Contributions:
 2006: Stand Out on Relix–February 2006 (Supplement to Relix Magazine)

Filmography 

 2011: The Blues Highway: Part 1
 2011: The Blues Highway: Part 2

References

External links 
 Ladell McLin is on IMDb
 Ladell McLin at AllMusic
 Ladell McLin discography at Discogs
 Ladell McLin on MusicBrainz
 Ladell McLin on Bman's blues report

Blues guitarists
American musicians

Year of birth missing (living people)
Living people